The 2010–11 Utah State Aggies men's basketball team represented Utah State University during the 2010–11 NCAA Division I men's basketball season. The Aggies, led by thirteenth year head coach Stew Morrill, played their home games at the Dee Glen Smith Spectrum and are members of the Western Athletic Conference. They finished the season 30–4, 15–1 in WAC play to win their 4th consecutive regular season conference title. They also won the 2011 WAC men's basketball tournament to earn an automatic bid in the 2011 NCAA Division I men's basketball tournament.

Although the Aggies were ranked 19th in the final AP poll and were one of seven teams in the country to win thirty games entering the tournament, the selection committee gave them a #12 seed in the Southeast Region where they faced Kansas State, the #5 seed who actually finished 21st in the final poll. Utah State was beaten by Kansas State by five points.

Roster

Schedule

|-
!colspan=9| Exhibition

|-
!colspan=9| Regular season

|-
!colspan=9| WAC tournament

|-
!colspan=10| NCAA tournament

References

Utah State Aggies
Utah State Aggies men's basketball seasons
Utah State
Aggies
Aggies